Crescent Spur is a community in Robson Valley, British Columbia. It is located northwest of McBride, British Columbia, on the Fraser River. The Grand Trunk Pacific Railway established a station here in 1915 under the name Crescent Island. In 1928, the F.G. Thrasher Company installed battery of six dry kilns at their sawmill, marking the introduction of dry kilns in this district. A post office was opened 29 December 1944.  It was closed 21 July 1969, re-opened 15 January 1975, and then closed for good 9 March 1977.

Climate
Crescent Spur is located in a snow and rain belt, and gets significantly more precipitation than areas to the west like Prince George. The number of days with precipitation during the height of summer is higher than anywhere else in Canada. Crescent Spur gets measurable precipitation for 21.8 days on average in July, which is the highest in Canada.

References

Prince George Citizen, 23 Aug 1928, p. 1.

Populated places in the Regional District of Fraser-Fort George
Localities in the Regional District of Fraser-Fort George
Canadian National Railway stations in British Columbia